Dante Harris (born June 21, 2000) is an American college basketball player for the Virginia Cavaliers of the Atlantic Coast Conference. He previously played for the Georgetown Hoyas.

High school career
Harris played basketball for Alcoa High School in Alcoa, Tennessee. He averaged 32 points and nine assists per game and led his team to a District 4-AA title as a sophomore. He transferred to Lakeway Christian Academy in Morristown, Tennessee. As a junior, Harris averaged 30.6 points, nine assists and four steals per game. He was one of three finalists for the Division II-A Tennessee Mr. Basketball award as a senior, averaging 32.6 points, 9.3 assists and 4.2 rebounds per game. He committed to playing college basketball for Georgetown over offers from Georgia State, East Tennessee State and South Alabama, among others.

College career
On December 13, 2020, Harris scored a freshman season-high 22 points in a 97–94 overtime win against St. John's. On March 11, he recorded 18 points and five assists in a 72–71 upset win over top-seeded Villanova at the Big East tournament quarterfinals. Harris was named most outstanding player of the tournament after leading Georgetown to the title. As a freshman, he averaged eight points, 3.4 rebounds and 3.2 assists per game. On December 18, 2022 Harris transferred to University of Virginia.

Career statistics

College

|-
| style="text-align:left;"| 2020–21
| style="text-align:left;"| Georgetown
| 26 || 21 || 30.3 || .349 || .260 || .897 || 3.4 || 3.2 || 1.2 || .0 || 8.0
|-
| style="text-align:left;"| 2021–22
| style="text-align:left;"| Georgetown
| 29 || 29 || 32.2 || .375 || .275 || .747 || 3.6 || 4.1 || 1.5 || .1 || 11.9
|-
| style="text-align:left;"| 2022–23
| style="text-align:left;"| Virginia
| style="text-align:center;" colspan="11"|  Redshirt
|- class="sortbottom"
| style="text-align:center;" colspan="2"| Career
| 55 || 50 || 31.3 || .365 || .268 || .798 || 3.5 || 3.6 || 1.3 || .1 || 10.0

References

External links
Georgetown Hoyas bio

2001 births
Living people
American men's basketball players
Basketball players from Washington, D.C.
Georgetown Hoyas men's basketball players
Point guards